Amrollah Dehghani is an Iranian Paralympic powerlifter. He represented Iran at the 1996 Summer Paralympics and at the 2000 Summer Paralympics and he won the gold medal in the men's 100 kg event in 2000.

References

External links 
 

Living people
Year of birth missing (living people)
Place of birth missing (living people)
Powerlifters at the 1996 Summer Paralympics
Powerlifters at the 2000 Summer Paralympics
Medalists at the 2000 Summer Paralympics
Paralympic gold medalists for Iran
Paralympic medalists in powerlifting
Paralympic powerlifters of Iran
21st-century Iranian people